Emil Sambou (born May 11, 1994) is a Gambian professional footballer who plays as a striker for South African club Engen Santos FC and the Gambian national team.

Sambou moved to Santos after a successful examination and skills assessment in summer 2016. Upon joining, the striker prognosticated that he would score 15 goals in his debut season for the club.

He recorded two goals against Cape Town All Stars in a 3-3 draw.

International career
Sambou was called up to the Gambia national football team for the round against Senegal.

He scored twice in a friendly for Gambia in a 3-2 win over Gambia Ports Authority FC.

References

External links
 
 

1994 births
Living people
Gambian footballers
Gambian expatriate footballers
The Gambia international footballers
Association football forwards
Santos F.C. (South Africa) players
Gambian expatriate sportspeople in South Africa
Expatriate soccer players in South Africa